Shimanto Bank is a schedule commercial bank in Bangladesh and related to the Border Guards Bangladesh. As the slogan goes "Shimanhin Astha", Shimanto Bank Limited aims to be the leading financial institution to serve with utmost trust. Rafiqul Islam is the chief executive officer and managing director of the bank. Major General Shakil Ahmed, director general of Border Guards Bangladesh, is the chairman of the bank.

History
The bank was established on 21 July 2016 through an act of parliament and planned by Prime Minister Sheikh Hasina. Maj General Aziz Ahmed was the founder chairman, Brigadier General Taufiqul Hasan Siddiquee was the project director, and Moklesur Rahman appointed as the first managing director and CEO of the bank. The bank was designed to provided financial services to the marginalized population of the country as well as active and retired personals of Border Guards Bangladesh.

On 1 August 2016, Muklesur Rahman was appointed the Chief Executive Officer and managing director of the Bank. Prime Minister Sheikh Hasina inaugurates Shimanto Bank formally on 1 September 2016. Founder chairman inaugurated the principal branch on 10 October 2016. The director general of the Border Guards is the ex-officio chairman of the bank. Major General Aziz Ahmed was the first chairman of the Bank and he was replaced by Major General Abul Hossain on 2 November 2016.

In 2020, Shimanto Bank had 12.09 billion taka in deposits.

In August 2021, Bangladesh Bank issued a show cause notice to Shimanto Bank Limited and nine other banks for having a low interest rate on their deposits. As of November 2021, Shimanto Bank Limited has 19 branches, 2 sub-branches and 19 ATM booths. In August 2022, Rafiqul Islam was appointed the chief executive officer and managing director of the bank Bangladesh Securities and Exchange Commission has asked Shimanto Bank to make preparations for an initial public offering.

Board of Directors

See also 
 Community Bank Bangladesh, managed by Bangladesh Police
 Trust Bank Limited, managed by Bangladesh Army
 Ansar-VDP Unnayan Bank, managed by Bangladesh Ansar and the Village Defence Party
 Bangladesh Rifles mutiny

References

Banks of Bangladesh
Banks established in 2016
2016 establishments in Bangladesh